Cheia is a mountain resort,  north of Ploiești in Prahova County, Romania. Situated in the Teleajen Valley, it is surrounded by the Ciucaș Mountains. Administratively, Cheia is a village, part of Măneciu commune. Cheia Monastery is located to the southeast of the town.

Heights, as shown in the panoramic photo (from left to right, view from the Babeș Peak):

Bratocea Pass (1,263 m)
Tesla Peak (1,613 m)
Ciucaș Peak (1,954 m)
Valea Berii
Muntele Roșu (the Red Mountain)
Gropșoare Peak (1,833 m)
Zăganu Peak (1,817 m)
Cheia resort (875 m).

Geography of Prahova County